USS Jeremiah Denton (DDG-129) is a planned  guided missile destroyer of the United States Navy, the 79th overall for the class. She will be named in honor of former U.S. Senator for Alabama, Admiral Jeremiah Denton (USN), a Vietnam War veteran and prisoner of war, who was a recipient of the Navy Cross. Jeremiah Denton will be the fourth ship of the Flight III series.

References

 

Arleigh Burke-class destroyers
Proposed ships of the United States Navy